"Wishin' and Hopin'" is the fourteenth episode of the third season of the American television medical drama Grey's Anatomy, and the show's 50th episode overall. It was written by Tony Phelan and Joan Rater and directed by Julie Anne Robinson. The episode originally aired on the American Broadcasting Company (ABC) in the United States on February 1, 2007. In the episode, Dr. Meredith Grey (Ellen Pompeo) struggles with her Alzheimer's-stricken mother, Ellis Grey (Kate Burton), becoming temporarily lucid. Further storylines include Dr. Izzie Stevens (Katherine Heigl) and Dr. Miranda Bailey (Chandra Wilson) continuously seeking patients for their new clinic, Dr. Richard Webber (James Pickens Jr.) dealing with the repercussions of his upcoming retirement, and Dr. George O'Malley (T.R. Knight) facing negative response from colleagues on his unexpected marriage to Dr. Callie Torres (Sara Ramirez).

Although the episode was fictionally set in Seattle, filming occurred in Los Angeles, California. Burton reprised her role as Dr. Ellis Grey in a guest star capacity, in addition to Sarah Utterback, who portrayed Olivia Harper. The title of the episode refers to the song "Wishin' and Hopin'", by British pop musician Dusty Springfield. The episode received mixed to favorable reviews, with the storyline involving Ellis being particularly praised by television critics. Upon its original airing, the episode was watched by 24.18 million viewers in the United States, ranked first in its time-slot and garnered an 8.5 Nielsen rating in the 18–49 demographic.

Plot 

"Wishin' and Hopin'" opens to a voice-over narration from Dr. Meredith Grey (Ellen Pompeo) about extraordinary events. The Denny Duquette Memorial Clinic has been opened, after a US$8 million funding from Dr. Izzie Stevens (Katherine Heigl). Four of the hospital's attending surgeons, Dr. Derek Shepherd (Patrick Dempsey), Dr. Preston Burke (Isaiah Washington), Dr. Addison Montgomery (Kate Walsh), and Dr. Mark Sloan (Eric Dane) are all seen competing for the position of chief of surgery, after the current chief Dr. Richard Webber (James Pickens Jr.) announces his plans for retirement. Meredith arrives to the Alzheimer's support home that her ill mother Dr. Ellis Grey (Kate Burton) is living at, and to her surprise, her mother has become lucid, but faints. Ellis is taken to Seattle Grace Hospital, her former source of employment. Dr. Cristina Yang (Sandra Oh), Dr. Miranda Bailey (Chandra Wilson), and Dr. Alex Karev (Justin Chambers) are awaiting the arrival of patients at the clinic, and Dr. George O'Malley (T.R. Knight) walks in to announce his unexpected marriage with Dr. Callie Torres (Sara Ramirez).

A cancerous patient, Marina Wagner (Amanda Collins), is admitted into the hospital and is revealed to have toxic blood - which the characters speculate may be caused by a chemical reaction between an herbal supplement and chemotherapy - making several physicians fall ill. O'Malley is exposed to the neurotoxin, and quickly becomes anxious, fearing that his marriage is the cause of the sickness.  This bizarre storyline is based in the real-life case of Gloria Ramirez in California in 1994, in which the "herbal supplement" was in fact the solvent dimethyl sulfoxide. Ellis is diagnosed with a heart condition, in which surgery or medication are options. Ellis does not want the surgery, but Meredith fears that she will not be compliant with her medication. Shepherd and Burke try to close up Wagner as the OR was evacuated before her surgery was completed, by entering the operating room with sealed, airtight suits. Ellis agrees to the surgery, but opts to speak with Webber, her former lover. A teenage patient is brought into the clinic by her father, hoping that a doctor can teach her how to use tampons. When her father leaves the room, she explains to Bailey that she had sex, but her pregnancy test is negative. Shepherd and Burke run out of air whilst operating on Wagner, so Yang, Stevens, and Meredith enter holding their breath to close the patient's incision. O'Malley's colleagues act in a rude manner to his new marriage, and displeased, he lectures them, standing up for Torres. Sloan is seen to be having sex with Montgomery, and Yang agrees to marry Burke. At the conclusion of the episode, Ellis' lucidity has vanished, leaving Meredith and Webber distraught.

Production 

The episode was written by co-executive producer Tony Phelan and Joan Rater, while filmmaker Julie Anne Robinson directed it. Featured music includes Psapp's "King of You", The Whitest Boy Alive's "Fireworks", Iain Archer's "Canal Song", Miho Hatori's "Barracuda" and Sybarite's "Runaway". Rater described that she got the idea after being told that her husband had to undergo a craniotomy. She noted that the plan for the episode was to focus on Ellis' inner feelings, mainly her fright, frustration and stress. "The concept of someone with this disease having a lucid day is real. The disease varies for everyone, but experts we talked to said that patients have bad days and good days and then sometimes they have great days where it seems like they are their old selves. Maybe it's a moment, maybe an hour, for some a whole afternoon, but we were fascinated with the idea of getting this time, this gift, and knowing that it's only temporary. What would you do with that one day? And what would it mean for Meredith?", stated Rater, explaining the premise of the episode. She also stated that "the cool idea" to have Meredith and Ellis connect again had been considered for almost a year before the actual concept of the episode was written, after numerous attempts to include the storyline in other episodes that "didn't feel quite right": "If you're going to give Meredith her mother back and then take her away again, you'd better have a pretty good reason." Rater also explained that, in her vision, the episode introduces a new period in the interns' lives, focusing on their finding an identity as surgeons, becoming more central than in the beginning of the season, which revolved around the aftermath of Denny Duquette (Jeffrey Dean Morgan)'s death and Meredith's involvement in the love triangle between her, Shepherd and Finn Dandridge (Chris O'Donnell).

Rater noted that the balance Meredith had just found in her life, finally having a chance at happiness with the man she loves, is shaken by her mother's unexpected lucidity, which was stated to have been written in the series in order to remind Meredith about the troubled years of her growing up: "If Meredith is ever going to be happy, she's got to deal with the fact that she had a really terrible childhood." In addition, Rater explained that Ellis' "awful, raw, ugly and terrible" statements towards her daughter were intended to make everyone realize the reason behind Meredith's alcoholism in college and her continuous one-night stands with inappropriate men. She also deemed Pompeo's performance in the episode "exceptional", describing what she regarded an "exceptional moment" which sees Meredith stand up to her mother. In response to the scene that sees Ellis interacting with Webber, Rater wrote that it is the first time she lets her guard down, exposing the previously hidden vulnerability, which allows her express the desire to be as happy and ordinary as her daughter. She also praised the performances of the cast, by deeming their acting "remarkable". "That is really what it's all about. We have to cherish the time that we have here, and love the people who surround and support us, even if they make us crazy, because things happen. Brain surgery, Alzheimer's and weddings. And the worst thing is to come to the end of your life, and realize, like Ellis, that you should have tried harder", stated Rater, putting the emphasis on the main aspects of the episode, characterizing it as "not ordinary".

Reception 

On its original broadcast on February 1, 2007 at 9:00 ET, the episode averaged 24.18 million viewers, ranking ninth in weekly viewership with an 8.5 rating, according to Nielsen. The episode was the fifth most-watched episode of the season, airing in the fourth week after the winter hiatus. The episode showed a significant increase in ratings, attracting 2.68 million more viewers than "Great Expectations", which received a 7.6 rating. "Wishin' and Hopin'" was also the leading show in the time slot, with 2.69 more million viewers than CBSs' CSI, which ranked tenth in weekly viewership with a 7.6 rating. Kate Burton, who portrayed Ellis Grey, received a nomination at the 59th Primetime Emmy Awards in the Outstanding Guest Actress in a Drama Series category, but ultimately lost to Law & Order: Special Victims Unit Leslie Caron. Variety listed the episode in its top 10 most bizarre medical maladies encountered in the series.

Staci Krause of IGN had a positive outlook on the episode, mainly due to the heavy development the episode's plot had in the season's progressive arc. She described the storylines involving the cancer patient's intoxication and Ellis' lucidity as achieving a balance, and moving the show "at a lightning quick pace". Krause deemed the episode "stellar", noting how it avoided the possibility of having negative points. Regarding the episode an "epic" one, she praised the scene which depicts O'Malley realizing the intoxication provoked by the patient's blood. "This is what we come to expect from medical dramas and it is great to see Grey's get back to this, while not sacrificing the personal stories", stated Krause, putting the emphasis on how "this case brought out the hero in just about everyone, pushing their limits for a patient". Krause noted that O'Malley has developed into a hero, stating that "pulling all the people in the operating room out, even though he was already sick and could have easily died from the effort" in a comparison to Sloan, described as being a man with no appealing traits and "unlikable ways", which attracted criticism from Krause.

On the topic, Krause elaborated: "The only one who didn't do anything particularly heroic was Sloan. That made him being with Addison at the end even better, because she was using him to sate a desire and that was very clear." Krause positively reviewed the idea of Ellis Grey's becoming temporarily lucid, deeming it "amazing": "She was not very endearing when she was lucid, that's for certain. She was unbelievably cruel to Meredith, telling her how disappointed she was that Meredith was merely ordinary. Ouch. But she did a great thing this episode too, during her short time as a sane person. She gave Cristina the answer she was looking for." The arc involving Callie and George's sudden marriage, named by Krause "a roller coaster", was described as being a way to emphasize the contrast between the two. Krause also noted the contrast between Stevens' kindhearted personality in the past, and the cruelty she proves to have in the episode, which was noted to have been "a highlight in perfect fashion", as well as a reminder for the multi-dimensional personalities of the characters. Also noted was Cristina's way of accepting Burke's proposal, following Ellis' answer, which gave her the hope she had been previously looking for.

Kelly West of Cinema Blend also expressed a good perspective on the episode, considering it to have been the best episode of the season. Deeming the episode an "eye-opening experience", West described Ellis' surprising personality as having worse repercussions on her daughter than the control issues and the intense disapproval that had previously been noted on the character: "You would think after Ellis had a few hours to digest the news that she has essentially lost her mind, she would take advantage of the gift that is her brief lucidity to patch things up with Meredith. Meredith was hesitant to sit and talk with her mother about the last five years but finally she decides this could be her only chance." Comparing Ellis' previous appearances in the series with the version presented in the episode, West stated she is "far worse" as a lucid person, noting how frustration and confusion are her main characteristics.

Also noted was the "completely erratic and borderline insane" behavior of Ellis at the realization that her daughter is focusing more on her love life than on her career, learning that the specialty, which she considers to be defining for a surgeon, is not a concern of Meredith's: "If this is how she was treating Meredith during her childhood and adolescence, it completely explains why Meredith is so dark and twisty." In addition, West noted the realism in Ellis' troubled personality, when she considers refusing the heart surgery, due to not being sure of wanting to continue her life in a state of forgetfulness and confusion. The scene which depicts Ellis interacting with Webber was negatively received by West, which regarded the whole conversation to have been based on his convincing lies, determined to give her peace. In response to Miranda Bailey's storyline in the episode, involving the sexually active teenager, West noted how the character was "direct, somewhat stern, but not unkind about the subject as she educates and consoles the girl".

References

External links
"Wishin' and Hopin'" at ABC.com

Grey's Anatomy (season 3) episodes
2007 American television episodes